Filippo Mancini (born 13 October 1990) is an Italian professional footballer who plays as a forward.

Career

Internazionale
Son of former footballer Roberto Mancini, Filippo was born in Genoa when Roberto was playing for Sampdoria. He joined Internazionale's Allievi Regionali team in 2005, when his father was the head coach of the first team. He made his first team debut coming on for the last 10 minutes in a 3–0 win against Reggina in the return leg of the 2007–08 Coppa Italia round of 16.

Reserve career
On 31 January 2008, Internazionale announced to have loaned him to Manchester City. He was released by Inter in July 2008. In the 2008–09 season he left for Monza along with his younger brother Andrea (who had one year left on his contract with Inter and was loaned to Monza). Filippo was played for Monza's Berretti Under-20 squad. That season Inter also loaned several players to the Monza reserve side, namely, Paolo Campinoti, Luca D'Errico, Nicolò De Cesare, Giovanni Kyeremateng, Domenico Maiese, Niccolò Scaccabarozzi, Davide Tremolada and Maximiliano Uggè. The Berretti team finished as the runner-up of the league.

On August 2009 he was announced as having been signed by Lega Pro Seconda Divisione outfit Bellaria–Igea.

On 30 August 2010, he was signed by Virtus Entella.

He returned to Manchester City in 2011 with the reserve team.
He played for the reserves (called Elite Development Squad) in 2012–13 season.

In June 2013 he was released by Manchester City and became a free agent.

Honours
Inter Primavera (Youth/Reserve Side)
Campionato Nazionale Primavera (runner-up): 2008

Monza Berretti (Youth/Reserve Side)
Campionato Nazionale Dante Berretti (runner-up): 2009

References

External links
 Profile at AIC.Football.it 

Living people
1990 births
Footballers from Genoa
Association football forwards
Italian footballers
Inter Milan players
Manchester City F.C. players
A.C. Monza players
A.C. Bellaria Igea Marina players
Italian expatriate footballers
Expatriate footballers in England
Italian expatriate sportspeople in England